Tajikistan first participated at the Olympic Games as an independent nation in 1996, and has sent athletes to compete in every Summer Olympic Games since then.  The nation has also competed at the Winter Olympics since 2002. To date, Andrei Drygin is one of two people ever to have represented Tajikistan at the Winter Olympic Games, being his country's sole competitor in 2002, 2006, and 2010.

Previously, Tajik athletes competed as part of the Soviet Union at the Olympics until 1988, and after the dissolution of the Soviet Union, Tajikistan was part of the Unified Team in 1992. The following athletes from Tajik SSR were medallists for the Soviet Union: Yuri Lobanov, Zebiniso Rustamova, Nellie Kim and Andrey Abduvaliyev.

Tajikistan won its first Olympic medal at the 2008 Summer Olympics, when Rasul Boqiev took the bronze medal in Men's Judo - 73kg. Dilshod Nazarov won the first gold medal for Tajikistan at the 2016 Summer Olympics in the hammer throw. 

The National Olympic Committee for Tajikistan was created in 1992 and recognized by the International Olympic Committee in 1993.

Medal tables

Medals by Summer Games

Medals by Winter Games

Medals by sport

List of medalists

See also
 List of flag bearers for Tajikistan at the Olympics
 :Category:Olympic competitors for Tajikistan
 Tajikistan at the Paralympics

External links